Stade 2 is the fourth studio album by Mr. Oizo. The album was released on iTunes only on 11 November 2011 on Ed Banger Records, and was released both as CD and in other music stores on 27 December. The Vinyl format was released in 2012.

This album has received mixed reviews, with Tiny Mix Tapes and Consequence of Sound particularly disliking it.

The cover art is a stylized imitation of David Hockney's 1972 painting Portrait of an Artist (Pool with Two Figures) by the artist So Me.

Track listing

References

Mr. Oizo albums
2011 albums